John Atkins (c. 1754–1838), of Halstead Place, near Sevenoaks, Kent, was an English politician.

He started his career at sea before setting up as a West India merchant with his brother Abram. He was elected an Alderman of London in 1808, served as a Sheriff of London for 1809–1810 and as Lord Mayor of London in 1818–1819.

He was a Member of Parliament (MP) for Arundel in 1802–1806 and 1826–1832, and for the City of London in 1812–1818.

He married twice: firstly Sarah Littell, a spinster with whom he had three sons and two daughters, and secondly Anna Maria, the daughter of the Venerable Andrew Burnaby of Baggrave Hall, Leicestershire, archdeacon of Leicester, with whom he had a further two sons and five daughters.

References

|-

1750s births
1838 deaths

Year of birth uncertain
19th-century lord mayors of London
19th-century English politicians
People from Sevenoaks
Sheriffs of the City of London
UK MPs 1802–1806
UK MPs 1826–1830
UK MPs 1830–1831
UK MPs 1831–1832
UK MPs 1832–1835
Members of the Parliament of the United Kingdom for English constituencies